Jensen is a given name. Notable people with the given name include:
Jensen Ackles (born 1978), American actor
Jensen Atwood (born 1976), American actor
Jensen Buchanan (born 1962), American actress
Jensen Daggett (born 1969), American actress
Jensen Huang (born 1963), Taiwan born American entrepreneur 
Jensen Lewis (born 1984), American professional baseball pitcher
Jensen Karp (born 1979), American writer